Karrab or Karab or Korrab or Korab may refer to:
 Korrab, East Azerbaijan
 Karrab, Razavi Khorasan
 Karrab Rural District, in Razavi Khorasan Province